Brett Whiteley AO (7 April 1939 – 15 June 1992) was an Australian artist. He is represented in the collections of all the large Australian galleries, and was twice winner of the Archibald, Wynne and Sulman prizes. He held many exhibitions, and lived and painted in Australia as well as Italy, England, Fiji and the United States.

Early years
He started drawing at a very early age. While he was a teenager, he painted on weekends in the Central West of New South Wales and Canberra with such works as The soup kitchen (1958). Throughout 1956 to 1959 at the National Art School in East Sydney, Whiteley attended drawing classes. In 1959 he won an art scholarship sponsored by the Italian government and judged by Russell Drysdale. He left Australia for Europe on 23 January 1960.

London
After meeting Bryan Robertson, the director of the Whitechapel Gallery, Whiteley was included in the 1961 group show 'Recent Australian Painting,' where his Untitled red painting was bought by the Tate Gallery. He was the youngest living artist to have work purchased by the Tate, a record that still stands. In 1962, Whiteley married Wendy Julius. Their only child, daughter Arkie Whiteley, was born in London in 1964. While in London, Whiteley painted works in several different series: bathing, the zoo and the Christies. His paintings during these years were influenced by the modernist British art of the sixties – particularly the works of William Scott and Roger Hilton – and were of brownish abstract forms. It was these abstract works which led to him being recognised as an artist, at a time when many other Australian artists were exhibiting in London, but from 1963 he moved away from abstraction towards figuration. His farewell to abstraction, Summer at Sigean, was a record of his honeymoon in France. He painted Woman in bath (1963) as part of a series of works he was doing of bathroom pictures. It has primarily black on one side and has an image of his wife Wendy in a bathtub, seen from behind. Another in the series was a more abstracted Woman in the bath II, which owed a debt to his yellow and red abstract paintings of the early sixties.

In 1964, while in London, Whiteley became fascinated by the murderer John Christie, who had committed murders in the area near where Whiteley was staying in Ladbroke Grove. He painted a series of paintings based on these events, including Head of Christie. Whiteley's intention was to portray the violence of the events, but not to go too far in showing something which people would not want to see. During this time, Whiteley also painted works based on the animals at the London Zoo, such as Two Indonesian giraffes, which he found sometimes difficult. As he said: "To draw animals, one has to work at white heat because they move so much, and partly because it is sometimes painful to feel what one guesses the animal 'feels' from inside." (Whiteley 1979: 1) Whiteley also made images of the beach, such as his yellowish painting and collage work The beach II, which he painted on a brief visit to Australia before his return to London and his winning of a fellowship to America.
Whiteley appears as a character in the book Falling Towards England by Clive James under the name Dibbs Buckley. His wife Wendy appears as "Delish".

New York
In 1967 Whiteley won a Harkness Fellowship Scholarship to study and work in New York. He met other artists and musicians while he lived at the Hotel Chelsea, where he befriended musicians Janis Joplin and Bob Dylan. His first impression of New York was shown in the painting First sensation of New York City, which showed streets with fast moving vehicles, street signs, hot dog vendors, and tall buildings. The Hotel Chelsea displayed several of Whiteley's paintings from the time he lived there, including Portrait of New York which was hung behind the reception desk.

One way that America influenced him is in the scale of his works. He was very much influenced by the peace movement at the time and came to believe that if he painted one huge painting which would advocate peace, then the Americans would withdraw their troops from Vietnam. Whiteley became active in the great peace movements of the 1960s, with the protests against America's involvement in the war in Vietnam. The resulting work was called The American dream, an enormous work that used painting and collage and anything else he could find on the 18 wooden panels. It took a great deal of his time and effort, taking about a year of full-time work. It started with a peaceful, dreamlike, serene ocean scene on one side, that worked its way to destruction and chaos in a mass of lighting, red colours and explosions on the other side. It was his comment on the direction the world might be headed and his response to a seemingly pointless war which could end in a nuclear holocaust. Many of the ideas from the work may have come from his experiences with alcohol, marijuana and other drugs. He believed that many of his ideas came from these experiences, and he often used drugs as a way of bringing the ideas from his subconscious. He sometimes took more than his body could handle, and had to be admitted to hospital for alcohol poisoning twice. Around him at the Hotel Chelsea, other artists and musicians took heroin, which Whiteley did not take at that time. The painting which was finally produced was made of a fantastic array of elements, including collage, photography and even flashing lights, with a total length of nearly 22 metres. However Marlborough-Gerson, his gallery, refused to show the work, and he was so distraught that he decided to leave New York, and he 'fled' to Fiji.

Appropriations
One image which uses van Gogh's style in a unique way is The night café (1971–72). He took the van Gogh painting and stretched the lines of the room to a single vanishing point, creating an image which appears fast moving and extremely vibrant and dynamic.

Alchemy
Part of his work Alchemy (1972–73) was featured on the cover of the Dire Straits live album Alchemy although it had the addition of a guitar with lips held by a hand. Alchemy is the mythical ancient process of turning ordinary compounds into gold. The original painting, done between 1972 and 1973 was composed of many different elements and on 18 wood panels 203 cm × 1615 cm × 9 cm. Reading from left to right, it begins with an exploding sun from a portrait of Yukio Mishima that Whiteley had started but never completed. The famed author Mishima had committed seppuku in 1970 and the literary mythology that arose of his apparent final vision of enlightenment in the form of the exploding sun, as he pressed the knife into his body, inspired and became the basis for this work. In terms of media, it used everything from feathers and part of a bird's nest to a glass eye, as well as shell pieces, plugs and brain in a work that becomes a transmutation of sexual organic landscapes and mindscapes. It has been regarded as a self-portrait, a giant outpouring of energy and ideas brought forth over a long period of time. According to art writer Bruce James, the self-conscious inclusion of the austere pronoun 'IT' that also makes up part of the work compacts life, passion, death and faith in a single empowering word and unites the notional wings of an altarpiece to nascent addiction.

Sydney Harbour and landscapes

Whiteley loved painting Sydney Harbour views in the 1970s such as in his paintings, Henri's Armchair (1974) The balcony 2 (1975) and Interior with time past (1976), which show an interior and exterior view starting with a room that leads through open windows to the harbour full of boats outside. In the latter painting, the table in the front of the room close to the viewer has minutely decorated vases and small objects, while a drawing on the left and a sculpture to the extreme right show how Whiteley often used erotic images in his works. He painted a view of his friend Patrick White as a rock or a headland in Headland; White had told Whiteley that in the next life he would like to come back as a rock. Whiteley painted other images of the Australian landscape, including a view of the south coast of New South Wales after it had been raining called The South Coast after rain.

He did paintings of the areas around Bathurst, Oberon and Marulan, all in New South Wales. He soon settled in Lavender Bay. He painted abstracted images of bush scenes such as The bush (1966) and also images which resulted from experimentation with various drugs, such as alcohol in the humorous Self portrait after three bottles of wine (1971).

Archibald and other prizes
In the late 1970s, Brett Whiteley won the Archibald, Wynne and Sulman prizes several times. These are amongst the most prestigious art prizes in Australia. The competitions are run annually, with the award ceremonies being held at the Art Gallery of New South Wales.

Whiteley's awards were:
1976
Archibald Prize: Self portrait in the studio
Sulman Prize: Interior with time past
1977
Wynne Prize: The Jacaranda tree (On Sydney Harbour)
1978
Archibald Prize: Art, Life and the other thing
Sulman Prize: Yellow nude
Wynne Prize: Summer at Carcoar

1978 was the only year in which all three prizes have been won simultaneously by the same person.

His first Archibald award, Self portrait in the studio, in deep bluish tones, shows an image of his studio at Lavender Bay overlooking Sydney Harbour, with his own reflection in a mirror shown at the bottom of the picture; a view of Sydney Harbour on the left establishes the location of the picture. Typically, the viewer is led deeper into the picture by means of minute detail. As with other works, there is evidence of Whiteley's love for Matisse, ultramarine blue, the Sydney Harbour location and for collected objects.

His second Archibald prize, Art, Life and the other thing, shows his willingness to experiment with different media such as photography and collage. His reference to art history, including an image of the famous 1943 William Dobell portrait of Joshua Smith, won a court case against accusations that it was a caricature, not a portrait. The work experimented with warping and manipulating a straight self-portrait, incorporating his pictorial sense of addiction.

He won the Wynne Prize again, in 1984, with The South Coast after rain.

TV documentary 
He was the subject of an ABC television documentary called Difficult Pleasure directed by Don Featherstone in 1989, which showed him talking about many of his main works, and his recent works such as ones done during a month-long trip to Paris; one of his last overseas trips. He also showed his large T-shirt collection, and talks about his sculpture, which he said is an aspect of his work that many people do not take seriously. Difficult pleasure is how he described painting, or creating art stating, "Painting is an argument between what it looks like and what it means."

Final years

Whiteley became increasingly dependent on alcohol and also became addicted to heroin. His work was not always being praised by critics, although its market value continued to climb. He made several attempts to dry out and get off drugs completely, all ultimately unsuccessful. In 1989, he and Wendy, whom he had always credited as his 'muse', divorced. He began a relationship with Janice Spencer, with whom he travelled to Japan, among other countries. He also spent time with friends including Mark Knopfler and John Illsley from the band Dire Straits.

In June 1991, Whiteley was appointed an Officer of the Order of Australia.

On 15 June 1992, aged 53, he was found dead from opiate overdose in a motel room in Thirroul, north of Wollongong. The coroner's verdict was 'death due to self-administered substances'.

Before this, his previous highest-selling work was The pond at Bundanon for A$. In 2007 his painting The Olgas for Ernest Giles was sold by Menzies for an Australian record of A$3.5 million. On 7 May 2007, Opera House, (which took Whiteley a decade to paint, and which he exchanged with Qantas for a period of free air travel) sold for A$2.8 million, in Sydney.

Legacy
Whiteley's home and workplace during the last four years of his life at 2 Raper Street in Surry Hills was converted into the Brett Whiteley Studio museum by the Art Gallery of New South Wales.

In 1999, Brett's mother Beryl Whiteley (1917–2010) founded the Brett Whiteley Travelling Art Scholarship in memory of her son.

Biography 
In July 2016, Text Publishing published Whiteley's biography, titled Brett Whiteley: Art, Life and the Other Thing. The author, Ashleigh Wilson, was the arts editor of The Australian newspaper. It was written with unprecedented behind-the-scenes access, and illustrated with classic Brett Whiteley artworks, rare notebook sketches and candid family photographs.

The book was longlisted for a Walkley Book Award and Australian Book Industry Award, and shortlisted for the Australian Book Design Awards and the Mark and Evette Moran Nib Literary Award. An audio version released by Audible in 2016 was narrated by Mark Seymour. The paperback, featuring a new cover, was released in 2017. On 23 November 2017 the book was named the people's choice winner at the Mark and Evette Moran NIB Literary Award.

Opera
In August 2018, Opera Australia announced that it had commissioned an opera to be based on the life of Brett Whiteley. The music will be written by Elena Kats-Chernin, with a libretto by Justin Fleming. David Freeman will direct and Tahu Matheson will conduct. Ashleigh Wilson, author of Whiteley's biography, is a consultant on the work. It premiered at the Sydney Opera House on 15 July 2019.

Film
In 2017, a feature-length biographical documentary about Whiteley was released in Australian cinemas. Directed by James Bogle and produced by Sue Clothier, Whiteley includes extensive archival footage and photos, personal notes and letters, as well as animations and dramatic reconstructions, although no new interviews were shot for the film. This approach was intended to allow Whiteley to speak "in his own words" about his life and art. The documentary was made with the approval of Wendy Whiteley, and was received with critical acclaim.

Notes

References

Further reading

External links

Brett Whiteley Studio – website of the artist's studio in Sydney, Australia, now preserved as a museum. Website includes biographical details and an image gallery.
Brett Whiteley at the Art Gallery of New South Wales
Brett Whiteley Profile – Includes a selection of paintings, artist quotations, biography and links to more resources on the artist
Brett Whiteley's friend and colleague George Sheridan webpage – Includes a selection of paintings done while working with Brett Whiteley
 
 Brett Whiteley, culture.gov.au

1939 births
1992 deaths
Australian bird artists
Archibald Prize winners
Deaths by heroin overdose in Australia
Harkness Fellows
People educated at Scots College (Sydney)
Wynne Prize winners
20th-century Australian painters
Chatswood, New South Wales
Julian Ashton Art School alumni
Neo-expressionist artists
Artists from Sydney
Julius family